The Battle of Pouancé was a battle in Conan II of Brittany's campaigns against the rebel Rivallon I of Dol, the Count of Anjou Geoffrey III, and the Duchy of Normandy's ruler, William.

During Conan's 1066 campaign against Anjou, he took Pouancé.

References

11th century in France
Conflicts in 1066
1066 in Europe
1060s in France
Military history of Brittany